The University of Santo Tomas–Legazpi, also referred to by its acronym UST–Legazpi or USTL,is a private, Catholic basic and higher education institution run and owned by the Philippine Dominican Province of the Order of Preachers (OP) in Legazpi City, Philippines It was founded by Buenaventura de Erquiaga in 1948 and named Legazpi Junior Colleges. 

UST-Legazpi, despite its name, is an autonomous institution, separate from the University of Santo Tomas in Manila.

History

Foundation
Legazpi Junior Colleges, the forerunner of Aquinas University of Legazpi, was founded on June 8, 1948, by a Basque, Buenaventura de Erquiaga (April 24, 1896 – October 22, 1959). From the onset till 1965, Buenaventura was assisted by a succession of presidents: Ramon C. Fernandez (1948–1957) and Bienvenido N. Santos (1957–1958); then after he resigned to join the faculty of the Iowa State University, by Margarito M. Delgado (ca. 1961–1963), and Dr. Manuel Lacuesta (ca. 1963–1965).

In 1952, its name was changed to Legazpi College. The educational institution offered elementary, secondary, vocational, tertiary and graduate curricula. Its science laboratory was considered as one of the best in the entire Bicol Region. An Institute of Research was founded to conduct experiments on local plants’ problems and the possibilities of developing local resources particularly the coconut and abaca products for industrial use. In the decades to come, these pioneering research efforts would move into production.

Transition
On July 1, 1965, the administration of Legazpi College was passed on to the Dominican Fathers. Rev. Fr. Ramon C. Salinas, OP, became the College's first Rector. Classrooms and library space were increased to meet the needs of a growing student population: enrollment in the College of Business Administration increased by 20 percent; College of Education by 27 percent; and College of Engineering by 18 percent. In 1967, the College of Nursing was opened. On March 7, 1966, the College Administrators, local and regional luminaries and guests witnessed the laying of the cornerstone of Legazpi College's first building in an expansive 32 hectare site in Rawis, some two kilometers from the old campus at the Legazpi Port District. By 1968 three new buildings were completed.

Elevation
There was a period of rapid increase in the number of enrollees, new course offerings, sprouting of new buildings in a new expansive campus, capped by the elevation of the status of the college to a  University, the first Catholic educational institution to earn the status in this part of Luzon. On March 8, 1968, the Secretary of Education, Hon. Carlos P. Romulo, elevated the College to the status of a university. On August 30, 1968, Hon. Onofre D. Corpus, acting Secretary of Education, signed the University Charter. Legazpi College was renamed Aquinas University of Legazpi. The investiture of the first Rector and President of the new University, Father Salinas, was held on February 3, 1969, amidst pageantry and color, attended by local, national, and foreign dignitaries. Father Salinas was Rector of Legazpi College from 1965 until the college was elevated to University status. Six Rectors and Presidents succeeded him: Rev. Fr. Dr. Manuel T. Piñon, O.P. (1978–1984); Rev. Fr. Dr. Pedro V. Salgado, O.P. (1985–1988); Rev. Fr. Dr. Patricio A. Apa, O.P. (1988–1992); Rev. Fr. Dr. Orlando C. Aceron, O.P. (1992–1995); Rev. Fr. Dr. Virgilio A. Ojoy, O.P. (1995–1999); and Rev. Fr. Dr. Ramonclaro G. Mendez, O.P. (1999–2011, three terms).

The University soon earned the recognition as the center of learning in Southern Luzon, chosen as one of the five Regional Science Teaching Centers in the Philippines by the Science Education Program of the Philippines with the assistance of the National Science Development Board, the UNICEF, and the Science Education Center of the University of the Philippines.

The Aquinas University Bureau of Small Scale Industries opened in 1973 the short-term, non-degree ladder-type course on Abacacraft Technology and Management. The course is offered to train selected out-of-school youth the necessary skills for the handicraft industry in the Bicol Region. The Bureau reopened on February 5, 1977, at the Plaza Arcade building in Peñaranda St., Legazpi City.

In 1975, Aquinas University acquired Legazpi Medical Center. The name of the medical center was changed to Aquinas University Hospital (now UST-Legazpi Hospital) 

Aquinas University joined numerous national and international federations of colleges and universities such as the Philippine Association of Graduate Education, Association of Catholic Universities of the Philippines (ACUP), Catholic Educational Association of the Philippines (CEAP), and the International Federation of Catholic Universities (IFCU). The University is also a member of the International Council of the Universities of St. Thomas Aquinas (ICUSTA); the Association of Southeast and East Asian Catholic Colleges and Universities (ASEACCU).

The Commission on Higher Education (CHED) named the University as one of the country's Center of Excellence in Teacher Education in 1996.

Expansion
While the administration of Fr. Salinas saw the laying of cornerstones of the three main buildings in the Rawis Campus, the term of Fr. Mendez witnessed more buildings being constructed: a permanent convent for the St. Raymund of Peñafort, the AQ Chapel, and the cavernous AQ Dome. The Daragang Magayon Hall was transferred to a more spacious, air-conditioned, venue. Classrooms were added and laboratories were upgraded. Engineering, Architecture, and Fine Arts classes are now held in a new building, the two-storey Fra Angelico. Since its acquisition in 1975, the Aquinas University Hospital has served as the base hospital of the University's college of Nursing, the recent vertical expansion of which altered the skyline of the Albay District and provided the most up-to-date holistic care to its patients.

Aquinas University Integrated Schools or AQUI (secondary level) has two curricula, one for Science High School (SHS), and the other for the Special Program in the Arts (SPA). The University's Professional Schools comprise the College of Law, Graduate School, and the Center for Continuing Education. The College of Business Management and Accountancy; College of Arts, Sciences and Education; College of Engineering, Architecture and Fine Arts; and College of Health Sciences comprise the University's tertiary level.

The AQ Labor Management Council has been a national finalist in the 2005 Search for Outstanding LMC for Industrial Peace, reflecting the harmonious labor-management relations in the University.

Established in 2002, the Aquinas University Foundation, Inc. (AQFI) has incubated various sustainable enterprises growing and producing indigenous and environment-friendly products, in the process helping reach out and bring employment to people in the rural areas. The AQFI now has about  devoted to reestablishing abaca as a top grosser for Albay and Bikol. The AQFI has also invested in coconut coir production and a system of deriving income from initiated and supported cooperative projects.

Aquinas University of Legazpi is now not merely confined to the boundaries of its campuses in Rawis and Legazpi Port District. The university has acquired properties to serve its institutional, educational, and development thrusts. "Bahay ni Kuya" in Albay District is now a Life Coaching and Wellness Center which is a timely response to the periodic calamities that visit the region. The Kyama Building near the downtown district now houses the AQ Pharmacy, a ‘botika ng bayan’ that dispenses low cost medicine. The Kyama Building also hosts the AQFI. The Holy Trinity Convent in Sunrise Subdivision houses the Dominican Sisters. The "Bahay ni Julius" in Tagontong, Taysan is being developed for future use. Estates in Banquerohan and Anislag are in the acquisition stage. The AQFI has earmarked these estates as relocation sites for some 800 to 900 families displaced by super typhoon Reming. The university has also reached the southern shores of Mindanao, with a farm in Tagum City and a house in Bajada, Davao City.

Integration
UST Rector Fr. Herminio Dagohoy, O.P. approved the renaming of Aquinas University of Legazpi to University of Santo Tomas - Legazpi after the decision was made by the UST Council of Regents in December 2016. An application for a change of name was made with the Securities and Exchange Commission which took effect in Academic Year 2017–18.

UST - Legazpi retained the Board of Trustees of the old Aquinas University as its own Board of Trustees including administrative and fiscal independence from UST in Manila.

Patron saints

St. Thomas Aquinas
St. Thomas Aquinas is the patron saint of University of Santo Tomas–Legazpi, and to whom the university was formerly named after.

Notable alumni
Noel E. Rosal, the incumbent Governor of Albay, and previously served as Mayor of Legazpi City, Albay. Rosal obtained his master's degree in business administration from Aquinas University.
Merlinda Bobis, a contemporary Philippine-Australian writer and academic.
Mae Diane Azores, the top-notcher of the 2019 Philippine Bar Exams

Sister schools
University of Santo Tomas, España, Manila
UST Angelicum College, Quezon City, Metro Manila
Aquinas School, San Juan, Metro Manila
Angelicum School Iloilo, Iloilo City, Iloilo
Dominican College, San Juan, Metro Manila
Dominican School, Sampaloc, Manila, Metro Manila
Siena College of Quezon City, Metro Manila
Holy Trinity University, Puerto Princesa City, Palawan
Colegio de San Juan de Letran, Intramuros, Manila
Colegio de San Juan de Letran, Bataan branch campus, Abucay, Bataan
Colegio de San Juan de Letran, Calamba branch campus, Calamba, Laguna
Colegio de San Juan de Letran, Manaoag branch campus, Manaoag, Pangasinan

See also
University of Santo Tomas-Manila
University of Santo Tomas–General Santos

References

External links
Aquinas University of Legazpi official website
University of Santo Tomas-Legazpi official website

Universities and colleges in Bicol Region
1948 establishments in the Philippines
Catholic universities and colleges in the Philippines
Dominican educational institutions in the Philippines
Education in Legazpi, Albay
Educational institutions established in 1948
Universities and colleges in Albay